"They All Went to Mexico" is a song written by Greg Brown, and recorded by Carlos Santana with Willie Nelson on vocals for Santana's 1983 album Havana Moon.

The 'going to Mexico' of the song title is a metaphor. Despite its upbeat, happy tune, the song is, at its heart, about death. The singer reflects on his long life, and how his dog, wife and friends have predeceased him. Ultimately he looks forward philosophically to his own demise.

Charts

Personnel
 Willie Nelson – vocals
 Carlos Santana – guitar, backing vocals, producer
 Booker T. Jones – keyboards, producer
 Barry Beckett – keyboards, producer
 Mic Gillette – trumpet
 Flaco Jiménez – accordion
 David Hood – bass guitar
 Graham Lear – drums
 Armando Peraza – percussion
 Raúl Rékow – percussion, backing vocals
 Orestes Vilató – percussion, backing vocals
 Jerry Wexler – producer

References

External links

1983 songs
Willie Nelson songs
Carlos Santana songs
Songs written by Greg Brown (folk musician)